Nicolás Ezequiel Watson (born 22 May 1998) is an Argentine professional footballer who plays as a midfielder for Instituto.

Career
Watson's senior career began with Instituto, who signed him aged twelve, in Primera B Nacional. Having been an unused substitute for matches with Quilmes, Sarmiento and Brown between December 2018 and February 2019, Watson was selected to start a fixture versus Ferro Carril Oeste on 16 February.

Personal life
Watson is the son of former professional footballer Sergio Watson. He has three brothers, all of which played in the Instituto academy.

Career statistics
.

References

External links

1998 births
Living people
Footballers from Córdoba, Argentina
Argentine footballers
Association football midfielders
Primera Nacional players
Instituto footballers
Sport Club do Recife players